Goniocarsia is a genus of moths in the family Erebidae. The genus was erected by George Hampson in 1926.

Species
Goniocarsia electrica (Schaus, 1894) Mexico
Goniocarsia subdentata (Schaus, 1911) Costa Rica
Goniocarsia veluticollis (Dognin, 1914) Ecuador

References

Eulepidotinae
Moth genera